Joëlle is a French feminine given name, the feminine form of Joel. Notable people with the name include:

 Joëlle Aubron (1959–2006), French anarchist
 Joëlle Békhazi (born 1987), Canadian water polo player 
 Joëlle Bergeron (born 1949), French politician
 Joëlle Bernard (1928–1977), French actress
 Joëlle Brupbacher (1978–2011), Swiss mountaineer
 Joëlle Cartaux, French figure skater
 Joëlle Ceccaldi-Raynaud (born 1951), French politician
 Joëlle De Brouwer (born 1950), French runner
 Joëlle Garriaud-Maylam (born 1955), French politician
 Joëlle Jones, American comics artist
 Joëlle Kapompolé (born 1971), Belgian politician
 Joëlle Léandre (born 1951), French double bassist
 Joëlle Milquet (born 1961), Belgian politician
 Joëlle Mogensen (1953–1982), French singer
 Joëlle Morosoli, Canadian artist
 Joëlle Mbumi Nkouindjin (born 1986), Cameroonian athlete
 Joëlle van Noppen (1980–2010), Dutch singer
 Joëlle Numainville (born 1987), Canadian cyclist
 Joëlle Rollo-Koster, French historian
 Joëlle Sabourin (born 1972), Canadian curler
 Joëlle Ursull (born 1960), French singer
 Joëlle Wintrebert (born 1949), French writer

See also
 Joel (given name)
 Joelle (given name)

French feminine given names